FuRyu Corporation (フリュー株式会社) is a Japanese entertainment company based in Shibuya, Tokyo. Their businesses include publishing and development of video games, mobile games, photo-booths, figures and multimedia content.

History 
In April 1997, Omron launched a new business in the entertainment industry titled "Columbus Project" at their New Business Development Center. The first product is a portrait seal printing machine titled "Ni-Terangelo". (a combination of "Niteru", meaning "to resemble" in Japanese, and Michelangelo) The company continue expanding into the print seal field in the following years.

In December 2001, the company entered the mobile content business by starting a media service titled "Poketsu".

In January 2002, the company entered the arcade prizes industry. In April of the same year, the business is officially established and named Omron Entertainment Division. The company is then split off in July 2007, with Omron holding 100% ownership.

In 2006, the company is renamed to FuRyu Corporation. The company also entered the mobile advertising business.

In April 2007, the company implemented a management buyout and succeeded all businesses and all employees to FuRyu Corporation.

In November 2008, FuRyu announced that they are entering the console game development and publishing business. Their first releases are Last Bullet, Chou Meisaku Suiri Adventure DS: Raymond Chandler and Sekai Fushigi Hakken! DS: Densetsu no Hitoshi-kun Ningyou o Sagase! releasing on the Nintendo DS in April, May and August 2009 respectively.

In April 2012, FuRyu acquired all shares of We’ve, which specializes in animation planning. FuRyu also entering the print seal machine specialty store management business and opened a store in Niigata.

FuRyu entered full-scale animation production business in 2013 following their involvement in the production of the movie "Dogsha" released on June 1, 2013.

In 2015, FuRyu changed the company logo also while also introducing the company slogan "Precious days, always". In December of the same year, the company is listed on the First Section of the Tokyo Stock Exchange.

Games published

Japan-only games

References

External links 

Mass media companies based in Tokyo
Software companies based in Tokyo
Shibuya
Japanese companies established in 2007
FuRyu games
Video game companies established in 2007
Video game publishers
Video game development companies
Video game companies of Japan